Casimir II may refer to: 
Casimir II the Just (1138–1194), Duke of Cracow and senior prince of Poland
Casimir II, Duke of Pomerania (after 1130 – 1180), duke of Pomerania-Demmin
Casimir II, Duke of Cieszyn (ca. 1449 – 1528)
Casimir II of Zator (ca. 1450 – 1490)